Overboard is a 1987 American romantic comedy film directed by Garry Marshall, written by Leslie Dixon, starring Goldie Hawn and Kurt Russell, and produced by Roddy McDowall, who also co-stars alongside Edward Herrmann and Katherine Helmond. Its plot follows a demeaning, wealthy socialite who suffers amnesia after falling from her yacht while vacationing on the Oregon coast, only to be taken in by a working-class carpenter whom she mistreated.

The film's soundtrack was composed by Alan Silvestri.  Although it opened to mixed reviews and was a box-office disappointment, Overboard has become a cult film and has been remade several times. In 1992, it was adapted in the Indian film Ek Ladka Ek Ladki, in 2006, it was adapted into the South Korean television series Couple or Trouble, and in 2018 it was remade with Anna Faris and Eugenio Derbez. The plot of the 1997 Malayalam film Mayaponman is loosely based on this film.

Plot

Heiress Joanna Stayton is accustomed to a wealthy life with her own yacht and fortune, along with her husband Grant Stayton III. While waiting for her yacht to be repaired in the fictional seaside town of Elk Cove, Oregon, Joanna hires local carpenter Dean Proffitt, a widower with four sons, to remodel her closet. Dean produces quality work, which she dismisses because he used oak instead of cedar, despite her not having requested this at the start.

Dean agrees to redo the closet if he is paid for the work he has already done, to no avail. The two have an argument, during which he berates her for her entitled attitude. This results in an angry Joanna throwing Dean and his tool kit into the water. That night, as the yacht sails away, Joanna goes on deck to retrieve a wedding ring, but loses her balance and falls overboard. She is later fished out of the water by a garbage scow. Now suffering from amnesia, Joanna is taken to the local hospital. Grant learns of this and heads to pick Joanna up, but after seeing her mental state, he decides otherwise. Intending to have her fortune to himself, he returns to the yacht and has parties with younger women, lying that Joanna has decided to leave him.

After seeing her story on the news, Dean seeks revenge by encouraging Joanna to work off her unpaid bill. He goes to the hospital and tells her that she is his wife Annie and the mother of his four sons. She reluctantly goes home with him and is appalled by his residence.

Joanna initially has difficulty dealing with Dean's sons and the heavy load of chores, but she soon adapts. As she masters her responsibilities, she learns about the boys' school and family issues, and that Dean is secretly working two jobs to make ends meet. She falls in love with him and starts to care about his sons. She streamlines the money problems with more efficient budgeting and convinces Dean to be a more responsible father.

Joanna makes Dean's dream come true by helping him design a miniature golf course. He also falls in love with her, but does not tell her about her real identity, fearing that she will leave. Four months later, Joanna's mother Edith learns what happened and threatens to have Grant hunted down. He is reluctantly forced to end the partying and return to Elk Cove to retrieve Joanna, whose memory is restored upon seeing him. Realizing that she was manipulated, a distraught Joanna returns with Grant to their yacht, which heads for New York.

Joanna finds her old lifestyle boring and is uncomfortable with how rude Grant and Edith treat the boat staff. She apologizes to her butler Andrew and the crew for her spiteful treatment towards them, and soon realizes how happy she was with Dean and his sons, prompting her to turn the yacht back towards Elk Cove.

The next morning, Grant finds out that Joanna has changed course and becomes insane. While taking charge of the boat, he admits to purposely abandoning Joanna and having numerous affairs with other women in her absence.

Dean and the boys arrive on a Coast Guard boat to rescue Joanna, but are called away due to a sighting of salmon poachers. She is stunned the boat is turning around, thinking Dean changed his mind. He runs to the back of the boat and calls out to Joanna. He then jumps into the water to swim to her, and she does the same. An insane Grant furiously takes aim at Joanna with a bow and arrow, only to be booted overboard by Andrew.

Dean initially believes Joanna gave up her rich life for him, but she tells him the money and the boat are hers. The two are then brought on board the Coast Guard boat, and they stand above his four sons who are making out their Christmas lists. Dean asks Joanna what he could possibly give her that she doesn't already have. She answers, "A little girl", and they kiss while the boat sails off into the sunset.

Cast

Production
Principal photography of Overboard largely took place at Raleigh Studios in Los Angeles, as well as Fort Bragg and Mendocino, California, with additional photography in Newport, Oregon.

Release

Box office
The film made $1.9 million in its first weekend, $2.9 million in its second (+34%), and $3.9 million in its third (+54%), totaling $26.7 million by the end of its run.

Critical response
On review aggregator website Rotten Tomatoes, the film holds an approval rating of 46% based on 35 reviews, with an average rating of 5.2/10. The site's critical consensus reads, "Goldie Hawn and Kurt Russell's comedic chops elevate waterlogged material, but not even their buoyant chemistry can keep Overboard'''s creepy concept afloat". On Metacritic, the film has a weighted average score of 53 out of 100, based on 13 critics, indicating "mixed or average reviews". Audiences polled by CinemaScore gave the film an average grade of "A−" on an A+ to F scale.Variety praised Hawn's performance, but called the film "an uninspiring, unsophisticated attempt at an updated screwball comedy that is brought down by plodding script and a handful of too broadly drawn characters." Rita Kempley of The Washington Post called it "a deeply banal farce" with "one-dimensional characters, a good long look at her buttocks and lots of pathetic sex jokes." Roger Ebert liked it; while calling it predictable, he wrote: "the things that make it special, however, are the genuine charm, wit and warm energy generated by the entire cast and director Garry Marshall." The Los Angeles Times' review of it read: "The film tries to mix the two 1930s movie comedy strains: screwball romance and populist fable. But there's something nerveless and thin about it. Hawn and Russell are good, but their scenes together have a calculated spontaneity—overcute, obvious."

The film has gone on to be considered a cult classic.

Home media
CBS/Fox Video released Overboard on VHS in North America in 1988. In Canada, it was among the top 10 video rentals in the country in July of that year. MGM Home Entertainment first released a DVD edition of the film in 1999. A Blu-ray was released by MGM in 2009.

In 2021, Severin Films reissued the film on DVD and Blu-ray from a new 2K master.

Remakes

A reimagined film of the same name, starring Anna Faris and Eugenio Derbez, was released on May 4, 2018. The main roles are reversed from the 1987 original. Derbez portrays a wealthy man who falls off of his yacht and is found by Faris' character, a single mother who convinces him that he is her husband.

A loose adaptation of Overboard is the 1992 Hindi film Ek Ladka Ek Ladki, directed by Vijay Sadanah and starring Salman Khan and Neelam Kothari.

The 1997 Malayalam film Mayaponman is another loose adaptation.

The 2006 South Korean television show Couple or Trouble, starring Han Ye-seul and Oh Ji-ho and directed by Kim Sang Ho, is also a loose adaptation of the film.

The 2012 Swiss film Liebe und Andere Unfälle is another loose adaptation of the film.

The 2013 Russian miniseries Wife Rented (Zhena naprokat, Жена напрокат) is also a loose adaptation of the film.

 See also 
 Mithya Swept Away (1974 film)

References

External links
 
 
 
 
 
 Overboard at the TCM Movie Database (archived'')

1987 films
1987 romantic comedy films
American romantic comedy films
Films scored by Alan Silvestri
Films about amnesia
Films about disability
Films about interclass romance
Films about the upper class
Films about the working class
Films directed by Garry Marshall
Films set in Oregon
Films set on boats
Films shot in California
Films shot in Oregon
Films with screenplays by Leslie Dixon
Metro-Goldwyn-Mayer films
1980s English-language films
1980s American films